Célestin-François Nanteuil-Lebœuf, known as Célestin Nanteuil, (11 July 1813 – 6 September 1873) was a French painter, engraver and illustrator closely tied to the Romantic movement in France. He was born in Rome of French parents who were part of Joseph Bonaparte's entourage. Nanteuil entered the École des Beaux-Arts in 1827, where he studied under Eustache-Hyacinthe Langlois, and then worked in the studio of Dominique Ingres. In 1848, he was made Director of Académie des beaux-arts and later became the curator of the Musée des beaux-arts in Dijon. He died in Bourron-Marlotte at the age of 60. His elder brother, Charles-François, was a noted sculptor who won the Prix de Rome in 1817.

References

Further reading
 Champfleury, Le drame amoureux de Célestin Nanteuil, d'après des lettres inédites adressées à Marie Dorval. Paris, Dentu et Cie, 1887 
 Aristide Marie, Un Imagier romantique - Célestin Nanteuil peintre, aquafortiste et lithographe, Paris, Carteret, 1910 
 Aristide Marie, Célestin Nanteuil. Peintre, Acquafortiste et Lithographe 1813-1873, Paris, H. Floury, 1924 
 Marcus Osterwalder, Dictionnaire des Illustrateurs. 1800-1914 (Illustrateurs, caricaturistes et affichistes), Paris, Hubschmid & Bouret, 1983, p. 744-745

External links

1813 births
1873 deaths
19th-century French painters
French male painters
École des Beaux-Arts alumni
Pupils of Jacques-Louis David
Members of the Académie des beaux-arts
19th-century male artists